Pierre Chébly (born Pierre Scebli; 19 December 1870 – 30 May 1917) was an archeparch of the Maronite Catholic Archeparchy of Beirut.

Life

Pierre Scebli was born in Defoun, Lebanon.  He was ordained to the priesthood on 14 July 1897, and appointed Archbishop of Beirut on 14 February 1908, aged 36. He was consecrated bishop the following day by Maronite Patriarch of Antioch, Elias Peter Hoayek. On 30 May 1917, he died in Beirut, aged 46, after nine years as Archeparch of Beirut.

References

External links
 http://www.catholic-hierarchy.org/bishop/bscebli.html 

1870 births
1917 deaths
Lebanese Maronites
20th-century Maronite Catholic bishops